PAP2 may refer to:
Diacylglycerol diphosphate phosphatase, an enzyme
Linksys, a brand of networking products